The valide trombone is a hybrid valve trombone invented in the 1940s by jazz musician Brad Gowans. It features both a set of three piston valves and a slide to vary the pitch. The slide on the valide is positioned within the valve section and is shorter than a regular trombone slide, only covering four slide positions instead of the usual seven. The slide does not lock, requiring the player to hold the slide at all times, and encouraging the player to use both the valves and the slide together.

The only known built instrument now resides at the Institute of Jazz Studies at Rutgers University. The last noted player of the valide trombone was Juan Tizol of the Duke Ellington and Harry James Orchestras.

The similar superbone, as redeveloped by Maynard Ferguson and Holton Musical Instruments in the 1970s, has a full-length slide with seven positions, placed between the mouthpiece and the valves.

References

Bibliography 

 
 

Trombones
Jazz instruments